León Chávez Teixeiro (Colonia Guerrero, Mexico City, April 11, 1936) is a Mexican singer-songwriter activist and painter. He began the composition and interpretation of social justice songs campaigning both politically and musically different social movements.

Bio 
Chávez Teixeiro was brought up by low-class parents in north of Mexico City, first in Colonia Guerrero and then in Colonia Plutarco Elías Calles. Her father was a mechanic, member of labor movements as Batallones Rojos, and his mother was a housewife. He suffered an accident at twelve that led him to leave school. As a child and adolescent he worked on the streets selling candles, popsicles and sodas.

At that time he began to be a street musician. Due to his inclination to the urban environments, he began to be involved as an activist in resistance in housing movements as Movimiento inquilinario in the face of the accelerated urbanization of Mexico City. He was also present in movements such as the Comité de defensa popular, led by Rubén Aguilar and which started in Colonia Francisco Villa in Chihuahua. At 60s decade he entered to the Centro Universitario de Estudios Cinematográficos, the film school of the National Autonomous University of Mexico.

Around 1968 he founded, together with others and other artists, La Comuna de Sor Juana, an artistic commune in colonia Santa María la Ribera. It was in this place where he met Álvaro Guzmán Gómora, an artist and guitarist, and where Chávez Teixeiro made his first compositions as El Gato. There in this commune he found with Guzmán and other musicians the group La piel and listen to Bob Dylan for the first time.

He became involved in workers movements and in the 1968 Movement in Mexico accompanying public protests with his social justice songs. In that context chábvexz participated as a cameraman in the crew of Leobardo López Aretche, filming the movement with materials that would appear in the further documentary El grito. México 1968, one of the few filmed materials of that episode.

References 

1936 births
Living people
Mexican singer-songwriters
Mexican songwriters
20th-century Mexican male writers
People from Mexico City
Mexican folk guitarists